In epidemiology, a disease vector is any living agent that carries and transmits an infectious pathogen to another living organism; agents regarded as vectors are organisms, such as parasites or microbes. The first major discovery of a disease vector came from Ronald Ross in 1897, who discovered the malaria pathogen when he dissected a mosquito.

Arthropods

Arthropods form a major group of pathogen vectors with mosquitoes, flies, sand flies, lice, fleas, ticks, and mites transmitting a huge number of pathogens. Many such vectors are haematophagous, which feed on blood at some or all stages of their lives. When the insects feed on blood, the pathogen enters the blood stream of the host. This can happen in different ways.

The Anopheles mosquito, a vector for malaria, filariasis, and various arthropod-borne-viruses (arboviruses), inserts its delicate mouthpart under the skin and feeds on its host's blood. The parasites the mosquito carries are usually located in its salivary glands (used by mosquitoes to anaesthetise the host). Therefore, the parasites are transmitted directly into the host's blood stream. Pool feeders such as the sand fly and black fly, vectors for pathogens causing leishmaniasis and onchocerciasis respectively, will chew a well in the host's skin, forming a small pool of blood from which they feed. Leishmania parasites then infect the host through the saliva of the sand fly. Onchocerca force their own way out of the insect's head into the pool of blood.

Triatomine bugs are responsible for the transmission of a trypanosome, Trypanosoma cruzi, which causes Chagas disease. The Triatomine bugs defecate during feeding and the excrement contains the parasites, which are accidentally smeared into the open wound by the host responding to pain and irritation from the bite.

There are several species of Thrips that act as vectors for over 20 viruses, especially Tospoviruses, and cause all sorts of plant diseases.

Plants and fungi
Some plants and fungi act as vectors for various pathogens. For example, the big-vein disease of lettuce was long thought to be caused by a member of the fungal division Chytridiomycota, namely Olpidium brassicae. Eventually, however, the disease was shown to be viral. Later it transpired that the virus was transmitted by the zoospores of the fungus and also survived in the resting spores. Since then, many other fungi in Chytridiomycota have been shown to vector plant viruses.

Many plant pests that seriously damage important crops depend on other plants, often weeds, to harbour or vector them; the distinction is not always clear. In the case of Puccinia graminis for example, Berberis and related genera act as alternate hosts in a cycle of infection of grain.

More directly, when they twine from one plant to another, parasitic plants such as Cuscuta and Cassytha have been shown to convey phytoplasmal and viral diseases between plants.

Mammals 
Rabies is transmitted through exposure to the saliva or brain tissue of an infected animal. Any warm-blooded animal can carry rabies, but the most common vectors are dogs, skunks, raccoons, and bats.

World Health Organization and vector-borne disease 
The World Health Organization (WHO) states that control and prevention of vector-borne diseases are emphasizing "Integrated Vector Management (IVM)", which is an approach that looks at the links between health and environment, optimizing benefits to both.

In April 2014, WHO launched a campaign called "Small bite, big threat" to educate people about vector-borne illnesses. WHO issued reports indicating that vector-borne illnesses affect poor people, especially people living in areas that do not have adequate levels of sanitation, drinking water and housing.

Vector-borne zoonotic disease and human activity

Several articles, recent to early 2014, warn that human activities are spreading vector-borne zoonotic diseases. Several articles were published in the medical journal The Lancet, and discuss how rapid changes in land use, trade globalization, and "social upheaval" are causing a resurgence in zoonotic disease across the world.

Examples of vector-borne zoonotic diseases include:
 Lyme disease
 Plague
 West Nile virus

Many factors affect the incidence of vector-borne diseases. These factors include animals hosting the disease, vectors, and people.

Humans can also be vectors for some diseases, such as Tobacco mosaic virus, physically transmitting the virus with their hands from plant to plant.

See also
 Airborne disease
 Asymptomatic carrier
 Fomite
 Globalization and disease
 Insect vectors of human pathogens
 Insect vectors of plant pathogens
 VectorBase: genomic database of invertebrate vectors of human pathogens
 List of diseases caused by insects
 Natural reservoir
 Waterborne disease
 2007 Yap Islands Zika virus outbreak

Notes

References

Bibliography
 
 
 
 
 Pawan, J.L. (1936). "Transmission of the Paralytic Rabies in Trinidad of the Vampire Bat: Desmodus rotundus murinus Wagner, 1840." Annual Tropical Medicine and Parasitol, 30, April 8, 1936:137–156.
 Pawan, J.L. "Rabies in the Vampire Bat of Trinidad with Special Reference to the Clinical Course and the Latency of Infection." Annals of Tropical Medicine and Parasitology. Vol. 30, No. 4. December 1936

External links 
 WHO page on vector-borne diseases

 Biological mosquito eradication in Monte Verde, Honduras
 The National Center for Biotechnology Information, Vector-borne Diseases: Understanding the Environmental, Human Health, and Ecological Connections
 Science Direct, Current Research in Parasitology and Vector-borne Diseases
 Science Direct, Vector-borne Diseases
 CDC Diseases Carried by Vectors

Epidemiology
Parasitology
Disease transmission
Infectious diseases